"A Man of the People" is one of four connected short stories in Ursula K. Le Guin's Four Ways to Forgiveness. It details the early life, training with the  Ekumenical Envoy service, and activities on Yeowe and Werel of Mattinyehedarheddyuragamuruskets Havzhiva, nicknamed "Zhiv", a native of the planet Hain. It contains Le Guin's most extensive description of Hain's environment and culture in her work.

The history of the Hainish people goes back three million years, and they placed colonies on many planets, including Earth and Werel. In the course of this long history civilization has risen and fallen many times, including settlement and terraforming of Ve, another planet in the Hain system.

In the time period when the story is set, the Hainish have recontacted their former colonies using Nearly-as-fast-as-light (NAFAL) starships and formed an association of worlds known as the Ekumen. However, the planet's population is divided into two broad groups, the "historians" of the "temples" who have contact with off-worlders and study the planet's past, and the residents of the "pueblos", who use a simple technology and are largely indifferent to the remnants around them:

Stse is an almost-island, separated from the mainland of the great south continent by marshes and tidal bogs, where millions of wading birds gather to mate and nest.  Ruins of an enormous bridge are visible on the landward side, and another half-sunk fragment of ruin is the basis of the town's boat pier and breakwater.  Vast works of other ages encumber all Hain, and are no more and no less venerable or interesting to the Hainish than the rest of the landscape.

Zhiv begins life as a pueblo-dweller but follows a lover to the temple society and thence into Ekumenical service.

References
Notes

Bibliography

Science fiction short stories
Short stories by Ursula K. Le Guin
Hainish Cycle
Post-apocalyptic short stories